Olga Tratsevskaya (born 25 March 1975 in Minsk) is a Belarusian rower. She finished 4th in the women's eight at the 2000 Summer Olympics.

References 
 
 

1975 births
Living people
Belarusian female rowers
Sportspeople from Minsk
Olympic rowers of Belarus
Rowers at the 2000 Summer Olympics
World Rowing Championships medalists for Belarus